The Man from Colorado is a 1948 American Western film directed by Henry Levin, produced by Jules Schermer for Columbia Pictures, and starring Glenn Ford as a Union officer who becomes addicted to killing during the American Civil War, William Holden as his best friend, and Ellen Drew as their common love interest. Robert Andrews and Ben Maddow based the screenplay on a story by Borden Chase. Although Ford received top billing as the mentally ill villain, Holden's role as the sympathetic hero is slightly larger.

Levin replaced Charles Vidor during filming.

Plot 
In Colorado near the end of the American Civil War, Union Colonel Owen Devereaux (Glenn Ford) orders his regiment to fire on a detachment of Confederate soldiers, even though he (and only he) has seen that they are signaling their surrender with a white flag. Afterward, his best friend and second-in-command, Captain Del Stewart (William Holden), finds the white flag, considers it, and then buries it as a surviving Confederate officer secretly looks on.

Immediately after the battle, the soldiers find out that the war has ended. As they celebrate, Sergeant Jericho Howard (James Millican) gets drunk while on duty and is insubordinate to Devereaux, who has him arrested. At a celebratory ball in the troops' hometown,  the mayor announces Devereaux's appointment as the federal judge for the region. Stewart asks Caroline Emmett (Ellen Drew) to marry him, but she is undecided between the two friends and later marries Devereaux instead.

When the Confederate major confronts Devereaux about the white flag, Devereaux disarms him and then shoots him several times with his own gun, even though the man has already been subdued. Stewart realizes that Devereaux must have seen the flag and concludes that the war has unhinged his mind.

He agrees to serve as Devereaux's marshal after Devereaux promises not to carry a gun or participate in arrests.

Many of Devereaux's volunteer troops owned mines before the war, but a wealthy businessman, Big Ed Carter (Ray Collins), has claimed the mines for his company. As a federal judge, Devereaux upholds Carter's claim based on a legal technicality.

Meanwhile, Jericho escapes and stages a series of gold robberies. Devereaux's uncle, Doc Merriam (Edgar Buchanan), hopes that the end of the war and marriage to Caroline will settle Devereaux down, but Devereaux hangs Jericho's partner after a hasty summary trial out in the country following a posse chase, prompting several other men to join Jericho. Devereaux also threatens to hang Jericho's younger brother Johnny (Jerome Courtland), based on circumstantial evidence after another robbery, even though Johnny is not part of his brother's gang. After warning Devereaux not to hang Johnny, Stewart finds Jericho and persuades him to turn himself in, but when Devereaux hangs Johnny  Stewart resigns in disgust and joins Jericho's gang.

After Stewart helps to rescue some men from being hanged, Devereaux lures him into town by spreading a rumor that Caroline is in danger, arrests him, and puts him in jail. When Caroline sees this, she breaks into Devereaux's desk and reads his diary, finally realizes that he is mentally unstable, and persuades Doc Merriam to rescue Stewart. She begins to put Stewart and Doc Merriam on a carriage to alert the territorial governor of Devereaux's instability, but he shoots Stewart. She then drives the carriage for Stewart and the doctor as they flee to a nearby mining town. Devereaux cannot get the miners to surrender Stewart and eventually sets fire to the town. When Carter accuses him of being crazy with jealousy over Caroline's loyalty to Stewart, he rides into town, and confronts Stewart, Jericho, and Caroline. Devereaux fights with Jericho and is killed when a wall from a burning building falls on them.

Stewart boards a stage to travel to Washington, D.C. to plead on behalf of the dispossessed miners, but promises Caroline he will return.

Cast
Glenn Ford as Owen Devereaux
William Holden as Del Stewart
Ellen Drew as Caroline Emmett
Ray Collins as 'Big Ed' Carter
Edgar Buchanan as Doc Merriam
Jerome Courtland as Johnny Howard
James Millican as Sergeant Jericho Howard
Jim Bannon as Nagel
William "Bill" Phillips as York
Denver Pyle (uncredited) as Easy Jarrett

See also
List of American films of 1948

References

External links

1948 films
American historical films
1940s historical films
1948 Western (genre) films
Columbia Pictures films
Films scored by George Duning
Films directed by Henry Levin
American Western (genre) films
American Civil War films
Films set in the 1860s
Revisionist Western (genre) films
1940s American films